FazWaz, also known as FazWaz Group is a Property technology company and real estate marketplace based in Thailand offering real estate for sale and rent across greater Southeast Asia, with agency offices operating in all 6 major regions of Thailand: Phuket Province, Bangkok, Ko Samui, Pattaya, Chiang Mai and Hua Hin District.

History
The website was first launched in 2015 as a data-driven property platform attempting to solve buyers' issues with market transparency and real home values. At this time, FazWaz served just the Phuket condominium market and differentiated from other property sites by its focus on "accurate and up-to-date data". The overall aim is to create a space for everyone in the market to gather and compare detailed information, from buyers and sellers to real estate agents and property developers alike.

Over the first few years of operation, FazWaz continued to gather data on additional regions in Thailand, eventually claiming to offer up-to-date data on all homes for sale and rent in Thailand, with current offerings listed as 40,447 total units. In addition to these data-driven expansions, FazWaz Group also partnered with companies like ThaiVisa, offering a custom property search portal on the ThaiVisa website powered by FazWaz technology. A network of partnerships with local developers and agencies as well as more-established property companies allowed FazWaz to develop marketing and growth strategies such as native site translations in six languages, soft-launches of sister FazWaz sites with offerings in six additional countries in Southeast Asia plus United Arab Emirates, and new-brand sites like BaanThai focusing on capturing other aspects of the Thailand real estate market.

In 2019 FazWaz officially announced its overseas expansion efforts focusing primarily on improving market transparency on homes in Dubai and Vietnam. A Phuket Property Watch article claims the site saw a 20% rise in organic traffic rankings between the months of December 2018 and January 2019. Recently the group announced that it had secured pre-Series A funding from undisclosed investors based in Singapore.

Milestones

See also
List of companies of Thailand

References

Real estate companies of Thailand
Companies based in Bangkok
Real estate services companies
Real estate websites
Online real estate databases
Real estate companies established in 2015